Pogonia may refer to:

 Pogonia (plant), a genus of orchids
 Pogonia, one of the names of the coat of arms of Lithuania since the early 15th century
 Pogonia coat of arms, a Polish coat of arms

See also
 
 Pogoniani
 Pahonia (disambiguation)